En Vivo: Juntos Por Última Vez (Live: Together for the Last Time) is the twelfth album by Mexican singer Alejandro Fernández. Recorded live in concert with his father Vicente Fernández, it concluded their extensive tour that took them throughout Latin America. The final concert that lasted more than five hours was held at the Foro Sol in Mexico City which housed over 60,000 people.

Track listing

Disc 1 
 Donde Vas Tan Sola (Manuel Monterrosas) – 3:19
 Loco / Si He Sabido Amor (Jorge Massias / Humberto Estrada) – 3:46
 Nube Viajera (Jorge Massias) – 3:52
 Cascos Ligeros (Manuel Eduardo Castro) – 2:31
 Que Digan Misa (Manuel Eduardo Castro) – 2:32
 A Pesar De Todo (Augusto Algueró, Antonio Guijarro) – 5:12
 Una Noche Como Esta (Manuel Eduardo Castro) – 3:13
 Si Acaso Vuelves (Homero Aguilar, Rosendo Montiel) – 3:19
 La Tienda (Manuel Eduardo Toscano) – 3:17
 Lastima Que Seas Ajena (Jorge Massias) – 4:19
 Aca Entre Nos (Martín Urieta) – 4:06
 Bohemio De Aficion (Martín Urieta) – 3:26
 Amor De Los Dos (Dueto) (Gilberto Parra) – 3:31

Disc 2 
 Que Seas Muy Feliz (Manuel Monterrosas) – 3:23
 Es La Mujer (Alberto Chávez) – 3:31
 No (Armando Manzanero) – 3:21
 Abrazame (Rafael Ferro García, Julio Iglesias) – 4:05
 Matalas (Manuel Eduardo Toscano) – 3:01
 Como Quien Pierde Una Estrella (Humberto Estrada) – 6:29
 Golondrina Sin Nido (Dueto) (Víctor Cordero) – 4:41
 De Que Manera Te Olvido (Federico Méndez) – 2:50
 De Un Rancho A Otro (Chucho Nila) – 2:32
 Las Llaves De Mi Alma (Vicente Fernández) – 3:02
 Mujeres Divinas (Martín Urieta) – 3:23
 El Ayudante (Manuel Eduardo Toscano) – 3:01
 Me Voy A Quitar De En Medio (Manuel Monterrosas) – 3:00
 Perdon (Dueto) (Pedro Flores) – 3:55
 Cuando Yo Queria Ser Grande (Manuel Monterrosas) – 3:41
 Mi Vejez (Martín Urieta) – 4:37
 Volver Volver (Dueto) (Fernando Z. Maldonado) – 3:43
 Las Golondrinas (D.A.R.) – 1:24

Chart performance

Album

Singles

Sales and certifications

References

Vicente Fernández live albums
Alejandro Fernández live albums
2003 live albums
Latin Grammy Award for Best Ranchero/Mariachi Album
Spanish-language live albums